In finance, rNPV ("risk-adjusted net present value") or eNPV ("expected NPV") is a method to value risky future cash flows.  
rNPV is the standard valuation method in the drug development industry, 
where sufficient data exists to estimate success rates for all R&D phases. 
A similar technique is used in the probability model of credit default swap (CDS) valuation.

rNPV modifies the standard NPV calculation of discounted cash flow (DCF) analysis by adjusting (multiplying) each cash flow by the estimated probability that it occurs (the estimated success rate). In the language of probability theory, the rNPV is the expected value.
Note that this in contrast to the more general valuation approach, where risk is instead incorporated  by adding a risk premium percentage to the discount rate, i.e. as opposed to weighting the cash flows.

See also

Expected commercial value

First Chicago Method
Penalized present value

References

Valuation (finance)
Fundamental analysis